DNU or Dnu may refer to:
 The New University Hospital (DNU), the largest single hospital in Denmark
 DAT LT, the ICAO airline code DNU
 ISO 639:dnu, the ISO 639-3 code for Danau language
 Decreto de necesidad y urgencia, a special kind of order issued by the President of Argentina
 Dnu Huntrakul, a prominent Thai composer and chamber musician